The 1982 U.S. Pro Tennis Championships was a men's tennis tournament played on outdoor green clay courts at the Longwood Cricket Club in Chestnut Hill, Massachusetts in the United States. The event was part of the Super Series of the 1982 Volvo Grand Prix circuit. It was the 55th edition of the tournament and was held from July 12 through July 18, 1982. First-seeded Guillermo Vilas won the singles title.

Finals

Singles
 Guillermo Vilas defeated  Mel Purcell 6–4, 6–0
 It was Vilas' 6th singles title of the year and the 58th of his career.

Doubles
 Craig Wittus /  Steve Meister defeated  Freddie Sauer /  Schalk van der Merwe 6–2, 6–3

References

External links
 ITF tournament edition details
 Longwood Cricket Club – list of U.S. Pro Champions

U.S. Pro Tennis Championships
U.S. Pro Championships
U.S. Pro Championships
U.S. Pro Championships
U.S. Pro Championships
Chestnut Hill, Massachusetts
Clay court tennis tournaments
History of Middlesex County, Massachusetts
Sports in Middlesex County, Massachusetts
Tennis tournaments in Massachusetts
Tourist attractions in Middlesex County, Massachusetts